André Moreira Neles (4 January 1978 – 6 February 2020), known as André Neles, was a professional footballer who played as a striker. His last club was Alecrim FC.

He started at Uberlândia, but only gained recognition at Atlético Mineiro. After compelling performances, he signed with Benfica in 2000, but could never break into the starting eleven, spending the following four years on multiple loan deals, which included Vitória, Internacional and Palmeiras. In 2004, he signed with Marítimo but only stayed there for a few months, moving from club to club on almost a yearly basis, mainly in the Brazilian lower divisions. Born and raised in Brazil, he was granted Equatorial Guinea nationality in 2007 and won 3 international caps for his national team between 2007 and 2011.

Club career

Early career and Benfica 
Born in Patrocínio in the Brazilian state of Minas Gerais, Neles started at Uberlândia in 1996 and spent there two seasons. In 1998, he moved to Anápolis for a brief stint, before joining Villa Nova, where he attracted the attention of Atlético Mineiro, who signed him in early 1999. He made his debut on 18 July 1999 against a team from Itaúna and after displaying good performances in the Campeonato Mineiro, he gained recognition amongst the fans. On 11 May 2000, in the Round of 16 of the 2000 Copa Libertadores, Neles created a crucial goal for Marques, that allow Atlético Mineiro to take the game to penalty kicks. In December 2000, he signed with Benfica for a transfer fee reported by Record to be €2.5M for just half of his economic rights. He made his debut in a friendly match against CSKA Sofia on 10 January 2001, scoring the opening goal in a 1–1 draw. However, in competitive matches, Neles was only a reserve player and he struggled with the lack of playing time. With stiff competition from Pierre van Hooijdonk and João Tomás, he netted just once in nine appearances.

In July 2001, Neles was sent on his first loan at Benfica, joining Marítimo for one year. He commented his dismissal by Toni saying: "I think I did not have a real opportunity at Benfica. Not even a league match in the starting line-up; only as an option from the bench. From the start of a game, only in friendlies. Of course it is difficult to perform like this." He also confess that he chose Marítimo because they had qualified for the UEFA Cup, refusing offers from Atlético Paranaense, Internacional and Portuguesa de Desportos. His spell there was only mildly successful, with two goals in 12 matches; a winner against Boavista on 10 December and an equalizer against Varzim on 23 December. In January 2002, André returned to Benfica and went on a second loan deal, now in Brazil, at Vitória.

There he won the Campeonato Baiano and scored 31 goals in all competitions, 10 of them in the Série A, which included a decisive goal against Palmeiras on 17 November, that guaranteed their relegation. In early 2003, he was sent on a third loan deal, joining Internacional until December. From his previous loan he acknowledged that returning to Brazil was good for him; he matured significantly and was hopeful of returning to Benfica. He started well at Internacional, with three goals in five appearances in the Brasileirão, but shortly after, a knee injury broke his momentum. Only a few months after joining Internacional, he moved to Palmeiras, at the time playing in the second tier. His spell there was unsuccessful, as he scored only one time, on 9 August against Portuguesa, and spent most of the time as back-up due to 19-year-old, Vágner Love.

Post-Benfica 

In January 2004, Neles ended his connection with Benfica and signed with Marítimo for one and half seasons. However, problems outside football led to his quick departure. In June, he was back to Brazil, playing for Atlético Mineiro in the Série A. In mid-2004, he changed teams for a third time in the year, signing with Figueirense, scoring one goal in five matches. In 2005, he joined Fortaleza and played only once for them, spending a year in the Saudi Premier League with Ettifaq FC, and having a two-month stint with Ipatinga. In 2008, Neles moved to Grêmio Barueri, where he played just one league game for them, before going on subsequent loans to Botafogo-SP and Ceará. He would return to Botafogo-SP in 2010, playing in the Campeonato Paulista do Interior and being the team top scorer with five goals and winning the league. In the same season, he would play for Oeste in the Série D and for Icasa in the Série B. In February 2011, the 33-year-old signed with América-RN and had good performances in the state league, remaining with América for the entire season.

In December 2011, he signed with Marcílio Dias in the Campeonato Catarinense, but only two months later, he returned to his childhood club, Uberlândia. In August, he had a second spell at Icasa, now competing in the Série C. Neles signed with São Carlos Futebol Clube in January 2013, playing for them in the second tier of the Campeonato Paulista. In 2014, he played at CEOV, helping them to a runner-up finish in the Campeonato Mato-Grossense and in May 2015, joined Rio Branco in the Campeonato Paulista Série A2.

International career
In 2007, Neles was offered two-hundred thousand dollars, plus an additional ten thousand per game, to change passport and represent Equatorial Guinea. Although he had a great-grandmother of African descent, he accepted to play for Equatorial Guinea because of the money offered by the Equatoguinean Football Federation. He made his debut in 2007 and according to him, played in 10 games and scored four goals. Two of those games were for the 2010 FIFA World Cup qualification. In February 2011, he returned to the national team after two and half years of international absence, for a friendly match against Chad.

International goals

Honours
Atlético Mineiro
Campeonato Mineiro: 2000

Vitória
Campeonato Baiano: 2002

Fortaleza
Campeonato Cearense: 2005

Grémio Barueri
Campeonato do Interior: 2008

Botafogo-SP
Campeonato do Interior: 2010

Personal life
Neles' younger brother, Átila Neles, is also a footballer – and a forward. He too spent most of his professional career in Brazil, where he played for Uberlândia.

He confessed to drug use during his time at Palmeiras. His flamboyant lifestyle earn him the nickname, "André Balada". Since then, he entered the Presbyterian faith to overcome his problems. In his incursion in the religion, André Neles recorded a disc of gospel music, sung by himself. Neles died of a heart attack on 6 February 2020, aged 42, at his home in Uberlândia.

References

External links

 
Official profile on Twitter
Official channel on YouTube

1978 births
2020 deaths
Association football forwards
Afro-Brazilian sportspeople
Equatorial Guinea international footballers
Equatoguinean footballers
Brazilian footballers
Equatoguinean people of Brazilian descent
Sportspeople from Minas Gerais
Campeonato Brasileiro Série A players
Clube Atlético Mineiro players
Esporte Clube Vitória players
Sport Club Internacional players
Figueirense FC players
Fortaleza Esporte Clube players
Campeonato Brasileiro Série B players
Sociedade Esportiva Palmeiras players
Ipatinga Futebol Clube players
Grêmio Barueri Futebol players
Ceará Sporting Club players
Associação Desportiva Recreativa e Cultural Icasa players
Campeonato Brasileiro Série C players
América Futebol Clube (RN) players
Campeonato Brasileiro Série D players
Botafogo Futebol Clube (SP) players
Uberlândia Esporte Clube players
Oeste Futebol Clube players
São Carlos Futebol Clube players
CE Operário Várzea-Grandense players
Rio Branco Esporte Clube players
Auto Esporte Clube players
Alecrim Futebol Clube players
Primeira Liga players
S.L. Benfica footballers
C.S. Marítimo players
Saudi Professional League players
Ettifaq FC players
Brazilian expatriate footballers
Brazilian expatriate sportspeople in Portugal
Expatriate footballers in Portugal
Brazilian expatriate sportspeople in Saudi Arabia
Expatriate footballers in Saudi Arabia
Brazilian Presbyterians
Brazilian gospel singers
Naturalized citizens of Equatorial Guinea